Ben Morley (born 20 December 1980) is an English footballer who played in The Football League for Boston United and Hull City. He latterly played for North Ferriby United.

References

1980 births
Living people
Footballers from Kingston upon Hull
English footballers
Association football defenders
Hull City A.F.C. players
Boston United F.C. players
Telford United F.C. players
Gainsborough Trinity F.C. players
Winterton Rangers F.C. players
North Ferriby United A.F.C. players
English Football League players
Northern Premier League players